K&N's Foods USA, LLC, a US based company, produces ready-to-cook and fully cooked chicken products at its manufacturing plant in Fulton, New York.
As the K&N's brand gained recognition internationally, K&N's Foods USA was established in January 2013, for producing products in the US to serve markets across US, Canada and other countries around the world.
K&N's produces a range of kababs, breaded products, skinless frankfurters and cold-cuts.

K&N's products are approved by USDA to be prepared using hand-cut Halal certified chicken.

See also 

 Chicken patty
 Food industry
 Food
 Broiler industry

References

External links
Official websites

Food manufacturers of the United States
Frozen food brands
American subsidiaries of foreign companies